Neil Street OAM (15 January 1931 – 6 October 2011) was an international motorcycle speedway rider, manager and engineer, who first arrived in Britain in 1952 to ride for the Exeter Falcons. Street was born in Melbourne, Australia.

He rode for the Swindon Robins and the Newport Wasps before retiring from racing in 1976. He made international appearances for Australia, Australasia, Great Britain and Norway. In 2002 he was awarded the Order of Australia in the Australia Day 'Motor Sport' Awards for his services to speedway.

Management
In 1981 he was appointed team manager of the Weymouth Wildcats. When they closed in 1984 he became manager of the Poole Pirates until 1999 when he handed over to Neil Middleditch. In 1984 he was also the team manager of the Exeter Falcons. In 1997 he also took over as manager of the Newport Wasps and stayed in charge there until 2005.

Street was also manager of the Australia speedway team and was in charge when they won the World Team Cup in 1999 and the Speedway World Cup in 2001 and 2002. In 2009, Street returned to take charge of the Newport Wasps for after the club returned to racing following the death of promoter Tim Stone in 2008.

Family
His daughter Carole married motorcycle speedway rider Phil Crump and his grandson, Jason Crump, has won the World Speedway Championship three times, in 2004, 2006 and 2009.

Engine development
In 1974–1975 Street became involved in designing engines. Ivan Tighe designed a four valve head for the Jawa engine, with input from Street. The engine went for manufacturing in just four weeks and was taken to Newcastle for a meeting held to be held the night before the Australian championships, but the meeting was rained off, so the engine was yet untested on the track. Phil Crump then used the engine in the Australian Championships at Sydney and took nearly 3 seconds off the track record held by Jim Airey. This was considered a remarkable feat considering the fact that the engine was straight from the workshop and had not been tested at a meeting. Crump had been given the option of his normal 2-valve engine, but after trying the 4-valve refused to get off the motorcycle as confirmed by Ivan Tighe.

Death
Street died at home in his native Melbourne on 6 October 2011, aged 80. He had been diagnosed with cancer 5 years previously but kept the illness hidden from the media. His cancer spread to his leg and as a result had a fall a few weeks prior to his death and banged his head but he did not tell anyone. He was unaware that the fall had caused a brain hemorrhage and Street slipped into a coma during his sleep and died on 6 October.

References

1931 births
2011 deaths
Australian speedway riders
Sportspeople from Melbourne
Swindon Robins riders
Newport Wasps riders
Exeter Falcons riders